Hermenegild Casellas Bosch (1890 – 1969) was a Spanish footballer who played as a midfielder and later as defender. Together with Alfredo Massana, he was considered the best Catalan midfielder at the time. Although history seems to have blurred the legend of Casellas, he was one of the most important footballers in the amateur beginnings of FC Espanya, being a pivotal piece in turning FC Espanya into an important team in Catalonia.

Club career
Born in Catalonia, He began his career at the youth team of Joventut FC, from where he joined Català FC in the mid-1900s, playing for them until 1911, when he signed for FC Espanya, with whom he played for nearly a decade. First, as a midfielder, and later as a defender, he was one of the main architects of the team's football power in Catalonia, competing head-to-head against the likes of Barcelona and Espanyol, being crucial in helping them to win three Catalan championships in 1912–13, 1913–14 and 1916–17, and he also was pivotal in helping Espanya reach the 1914 Copa del Rey Final, which still stands as the only Copa del Rey Final of the club's history, but they lost 1–2 to Athletic Bilbao, courtesy of a brace from Severino Zuazo. He retired in 1918, and later became the club's manager.

International career
He played several matches for the Catalonia national team, against the likes of Basque Country, France and Madrid, the latter of which being the decisive game of the 1916 Prince of Asturias Cup, which ended in a 2–2 draw that proved enough for Catalonia to lift their first-ever piece of silverware. Casellas scored his only goal for the Catalans in a 2–2 draw with Gipuzkoa on 1 November 1915.

Later life
Around 1916 he moved to El Pla de Santa Maria, where he introduced football to the town, and where he lived until his death in 1969, at the age of 79.

Honours

Club
FC Espanya
Catalan championship:
Champions (3): 1912–13, 1913–14 and 1916–17

Copa del Rey:
Runner-up (1): 1914

International
Catalonia
Prince of Asturias Cup:
Champions (1): 1916

References

1890 births
1969 deaths
Spanish footballers
Association football defenders
Footballers from Catalonia
RCD Espanyol footballers
Catalonia international footballers